Dawn is the debut studio album by American singer-songwriter Yebba. It was released on September 10, 2021, through RCA Records.

Background and composition
In 2017, Yebba independently released her debut single "Evergreen", co-written with British musician-songwriter Jin Jin, which earned her a record deal with Pulse Records. In the process, she met Mark Ronson, who helped produced Dawn, and worked with him for material on his 2019 album Late Night Feelings. Ronson revealed that, whilst working with him, Yebba was steadfast in her taste. "You’re never going to get a sound or a colour or a tone past Yebba that she doesn't like," he said. When touching on the creative process of Dawn, he elaborated, "She put her trust in me, but only in the name of realizing her vision" and said she was definitely "one of the greatest vocalists I've ever recorded; certainly one of the greatest vocalists, songwriters and musicians of her generation."

By the end of 2018, after mourning the death of her mother the previous year and a lot of time considering to release music as an artist herself, she signed a record deal with RCA Records. She said, "I made sure I did two-and-a-half years of self-homework, of digesting a trauma before I could make a commitment to an entire company." As for Ronson, he admits "There was a time where of course we would have loved to sign her to our label Zelig Records (a sub-label to Columbia), but she had different ideas." With the deal in hand, she began writing material for the album, which was later revealed to be named after her mother.

Critical reception

Reviewing the album for Variety, Jem Aswad wrote that on the album, Yebba "occupies a musical terrain somewhere between pop, R&B and, at times, 1970s jazz fusion, with tinkling electric piano and synthesizers that conjure flashes of Stevie Wonder's Fulfillingness' First Finale." Aswad went on to say that an "obsession with D'Angelo's 2000 classic Voodoo led Yebba and Ronson to enlist several of that album's musicians" for Dawn, including the Roots drummer Questlove, bassist Pino Palladino and keyboardist James Poyser. Aswad also felt that the "album's diversity is reflected in its collaborators", naming the rappers A$AP Rocky and Smino, electronic musician Kaytranada, and Beck's guitarist Smokey Hormel as examples.

Track listing

Notes
  signifies a co-producer
  signifies a miscellaneous producer
  signifies a vocal producer
 "Stand" interpolates the song "When U Went Away", as performed by Mark Ronson and featuring vocals from Yebba.

Charts

References

2021 debut albums
Yebba albums
Albums produced by Kaytranada
Albums produced by Thomas Brenneck
Albums produced by Mark Ronson
Albums produced by Yebba
Albums recorded at Electric Lady Studios
RCA Records albums